The Foxton Inclined Plane Trust is a waterway society and a registered charity on the Grand Union Canal at Foxton, Leicestershire, England, UK. It was founded in 1980 to promote the restoration of the Victorian boat lift or inclined plane, a unique and famous piece of canal history.

The Trust runs the Foxton Canal Museum which was opened in 1989 and is also the Trust headquarters, in the former boiler house.

It is campaigning for the full restoration of the boat lift, and it is a partner in the Foxton Locks Partnership, composed of British Waterways, the Inland Waterways Association, the Old Union Canals Society and local authorities.

The Foxton Locks Partnership has already obtained £1.78 million from the Heritage Lottery Fund for preliminary restoration works on the site, including:
re-watering an arm of the canal
dredging and repairing the bottom basin
replacing a missing bridge over the Harborough Arm
improving footpaths for better access to the  site

The Foxton Inclined Plane was opened in 1900, refurbished between 1909 and 1910, and closed in 1911. It was demolished in 1928.

The Inclined plane is part of a site which includes a Scheduled Ancient Monument and a Grade II* listed staircase of locks.

See also
Foxton Locks with information about Lock staircases, and a section on the Foxton Inclined Plane
List of waterway societies in the United Kingdom

References

External links
Foxton Inclined Plane Trust website

UK Parliament, House of Commons Select Committee on Environment, Food and Rural Affairs: Memorandum submitted by the Foxton Inclined Plane Trust
Harborough District Council listing for Foxton Inclined Plane Trust
Harborough Mail: Inclined Plane Trust "Highly commended" in the Best Special Category for Leicestershire County Council Renaissance Heritage Awards
Heritage Lottery Fund grant of £ 1.78 million for Inclined Plane
British Waterways Press Release, 7 September 2005: Is Foxton Locks one of England's Seven Wonders?
British Waterways' Leisure website "Waterscape" - entry for Foxton Inclined Plane Trust
British Waterways Newsroom - Conservation of Foxton's famous Inclined Plane continues
Inland Waterways Association page on the Inclined Plane and the Trust
Community Archives - photo of the old inclined plane
Foxton Inclined Plane Boat Lift description

Waterways organisations in England
Canals in England
Charities based in Leicestershire